El Malas Mañas is the fifth album by Mexican iconic pop singer Verónica Castro. It was released in 1982.

Track listing
 "EL MALAS MAÑAS" (Ramiro Aguilar)
 "POBRE GORRION" (Esperanza Acevedo) 
 "SOLO PALABRAS DE AMOR" (Jesús Dominguez; Memo Mendez Gulu) 
 "MI TIO PANCHO" (Manolo Marroqui)
 "POR DERECHO DE ANTIGUEDAD" (Lolita de la Colina)
 "UNA AVENTURA" (Juan Gabriel)
 "AMIGA FIEL" (Rodolfo Hernandez)
 "MORENO DEL ALMA MIA" (Tirzo Paiz)
 "LA DEL RADIO" (Denise de Kalafe)
 "YA SE TE FUE EL TREN" (Cuco Sanchez)

Singles

1982 albums
Verónica Castro albums